Daw's House is a hamlet in the parish of South Petherwin, Cornwall, England, on the outskirts of the significant town of Launceston.

References

Hamlets in Cornwall